Badarpur Assembly constituency may refer to 
 Badarpur, Assam Assembly constituency
 Badarpur, Delhi Assembly constituency